Carneal, Herb Carneal (1923–2007), was an American sports announcer.

Carneal may also refer to:

People
Russell M. Carneal (1918–1998), American legislator and judge
William T. Carneal (1920–1944), U.S. Army soldier killed in World War II
Michael Carneal (born 1983), perpetrator of the Heath High School shooting

Places
Carneal House, historic residence in Covington, Kentucky